Tahit Moos Al-Hallaq (Arabic: تحت موس الحلاق) is an Iraqi comedy television show.

Plot
The series revolves, in one of Baghdad's lanes, and it is a popular one. All of its people are from the low-class (working poor). Its main  character, Haji Radhi (Saleem Al-Basri) is a Hairstylist that doesn't know how to read and write, so he's an illiterate. His assistant, A'bousi (Hammoudi Al-Harithi) is a little bit crazy, but he dropped school at fifth grade, so he knows the basics of reading and writing. Most of the people of this lane are illiterates, so they go to an anti-illiteracy school. And they have many adventures together, because they're all friends.

Characters
 Haji Radhi - Saleem Al-Basri - He is a poor simple man that cuts hair.
 A'bousi - Hammoudi Al-Harithti - He is a poor man that works as an assistant to Haji Radhi (his Master) as he said.
 Abu Ghanim - Rasim Al-Jumaily - He is a poor man that works as a smith. He has a son studying in India.
And many others...

The Idea
All of its episodes show how do people from a low-class treat people from middle or high-class. The first episode showed how illiterates treat their teacher. At the second episode, it showed how a poor ill man treats the doctor, and many more episodes that show the relations between low and high-class people.

The Popularity
It became a routine for the Iraqi people to watch it. It became the most famous television show in Iraq, back in the 1960s. The people loved it because of its simple scripts, decors, clothes, locations and ideas, so it showed the people, the Baghdadi community in the 1960s, on its natural way.

See also

 Iraqi Republic (1958–68)
 Abdul Karim Qassim
 Cinema of Iraq
 Iraqi National Theater

References

1961 Iraqi television series debuts
1969 Iraqi television series endings
1960s Iraqi television series
Iraqi television shows
Iraqi television sitcoms